The 2007 Nigerian Senate election in Kaduna State was held on April 21, 2007, to elect members of the Nigerian Senate to represent Kaduna State. Mohammed Kabir Jibril representing Kaduna Central, Caleb Zagi representing Kaduna South and Ahmed Makarfi representing Kaduna North all won on the platform of the Peoples Democratic Party.

Overview

Summary

Results

Kaduna Central 
The election was won by Mohammed Kabir Jibril of the Peoples Democratic Party.

Kaduna South 
The election was won by Caleb Zagi of the Peoples Democratic Party.

Kaduna North 
The election was won by Ahmed Makarfi of the Peoples Democratic Party.

References 

April 2007 events in Nigeria
Kaduna State Senate elections
Kad